The 2001–02 NBA season was the Kings' 53rd season in the National Basketball Association, and 17th season in Sacramento. During the off-season, the Kings acquired Mike Bibby from the Vancouver Grizzlies, who had just relocated to Memphis, Tennessee. Despite Chris Webber missing the first 20 games due to a preseason ankle injury, the Kings won 17 of their first 22 games, then posted a 12-game winning streak between December and January, as they held a 37–12 record before the All-Star break. The team won eleven straight games near the end of the season, finishing with a 61–21 record (.744 winning percentage), the best record in the league, while winning their division for the first time since 1979, when the team was in Kansas City. The Kings also made the Western Conference Finals for the first time since 1981 (also as the Kansas City Kings).

Webber averaged 24.5 points, 10.1 rebounds, 4.8 assists, 1.7 steals and 1.4 blocks per game in 54 games, as he was named to the All-NBA Second Team. Peja Stojaković finished second on the team in scoring averaging 21.2 points per game, while Bibby provided the team with 13.7 points and 5.0 assists per game. In addition, Doug Christie averaged 12.0 points and 2.0 steals per game, and was named to the NBA All-Defensive Second Team, while Vlade Divac provided the team with 11.1 points and 8.4 rebounds per game, sixth man Bobby Jackson also contributed 11.1 points per game off the bench, and second-year forward Hedo Türkoğlu averaged 10.1 points and 4.5 rebounds per game also off the bench. Webber and Stojaković were both selected for the 2002 NBA All-Star Game in Philadelphia, while Webber also finished in seventh place in Most Valuable Player voting, and Jackson finished in second place in Sixth Man of the Year voting.

In the playoffs, the Kings defeated the Utah Jazz three games to one in the Western Conference First Round, and defeated the Dallas Mavericks four games to one in the Western Conference Semi-finals, despite losing Stojaković to an ankle injury in Game 3, which the Kings won on the road, 125–119.

In their first trip to the Western Conference Finals, the Kings faced the 3rd-seeded and 2-time defending champion Los Angeles Lakers, who were led by Kobe Bryant and Shaquille O'Neal. The Kings would take a 3–2 series lead over the Lakers, but went on to lose the final two games in one of the most controversial playoff series in NBA history. Game 6 was the most controversial game of the series with the calls made by the referees, and with the Lakers winning 106–102 at home. The Lakers would then go on to defeat the New Jersey Nets in four straight games in the NBA Finals, winning their third consecutive championship.

Draft picks

Roster

Regular season

Season standings

Record vs. opponents

Game log

|-style="background:#cfc;"
| 1
| October 30
| Seattle
| 
| Vlade Divac (27)
| Peja Stojaković (9)
| Vlade Divac (8)
| ARCO Arena17,317
| 1–0

|-style="background:#cfc;"
| 2
| November 3
| @ Denver
| 
| Peja Stojaković (24)
| Pollard, Türkoğlu, Funderburke (7)
| Vlade Divac (8)
| Pepsi Center15,138
| 2–0
|-style="background:#cfc;"
| 3
| November 4
| San Antonio
| 
| Vlade Divac (25)
| Vlade Divac (11)
| Bibby, Divac, Christie (5)
| ARCO Arena17,317
| 3–0
|-style="background:#cfc;"
| 4
| November 6
| @ Cleveland
| 
| Peja Stojaković (32)
| Stojaković, Divac (10)
| Divac, Bibby, Türkoğlu (6)
| Gund Arena14,584
| 4–0
|-style="background:#fcc;"
| 5
| November 7
| @ Indiana
| 
| Peja Stojaković (36)
| Vlade Divac (10)
| Vlade Divac (6)
| Conseco Fieldhouse15,309
| 4–1
|-style="background:#fcc;"
| 6
| November 9
| @ Orlando
| 
| Peja Stojaković (31)
| Vlade Divac (15)
| Mike Bibby (9)
| TD Waterhouse Centre17,248
| 4–2
|-style="background:#cfc;"
| 7
| November 10
| @ Miami
| 
| Peja Stojaković (22)
| Vlade Divac (10)
| Mike Bibby (5)
| American Airlines Arena17,853
| 5–2
|-style="background:#cfc;"
| 8
| November 13
| Toronto
| 
| Bibby, Christie (20)
| Scot Pollard (12)
| Divac, Stojaković, Christie (4)
| ARCO Arena17,317
| 6–2
|-style="background:#cfc;"
| 9
| November 16
| Chicago
| 
| Peja Stojaković (21)
| Lawrence Funderburke (8)
| Vlade Divac (4)
| ARCO Arena17,317
| 7–2
|-style="background:#fcc;"
| 10
| November 18
| @ L.A. Lakers
| 
| Peja Stojaković (25)
| Vlade Divac (15)
| Vlade Divac (8)
| Staples Center18,997
| 7–3
|-style="background:#cfc;"
| 11
| November 19
| Houston
| 
| Peja Stojaković (25)
| Scot Pollard (14)
| Doug Christie (7)
| ARCO Arena17,317
| 8–3
|-style="background:#cfc;"
| 12
| November 21
| Portland
| 
| Mike Bibby (25)
| Divac, Pollard (10)
| Doug Christie (5)
| ARCO Arena17,317
| 9–3
|-style="background:#cfc;"
| 13
| November 24
| New Jersey
| 
| Peja Stojaković (29)
| Vlade Divac (19)
| Vlade Divac (7)
| ARCO Arena17,317
| 10–3
|-style="background:#fcc;"
| 14
| November 26
| @ Memphis
| 
| Peja Stojaković (21)
| Pollard, Divac (12)
| Mike Bibby (11)
| Pyramid Arena12,215
| 10–4
|-style="background:#cfc;"
| 15
| November 27
| @ Houston
| 
| Peja Stojaković (24)
| Scot Pollard (11)
| Peja Stojaković (5)
| Compaq Center10,467
| 11–4
|-style="background:#cfc;"
| 16
| November 29
| @ Dallas
| 
| Peja Stojaković (32)
| Scot Pollard (17)
| Doug Christie (6)
| American Airlines Center18,384
| 12–4
|-style="background:#cfc;"
| 17
| November 30
| @ San Antonio
| 
| Hedo Türkoğlu (24)
| Stojaković, Jackson (8)
| Bibby, Christie, Jackson (4)
| Alamodome26,808
| 13–4

|-style="background:#fcc;"
| 18
| December 2
| Dallas
| 
| Peja Stojaković (31)
| Vlade Divac (17)
| Mike Bibby (6)
| ARCO Arena17,317
| 13–5
|-style="background:#cfc;"
| 19
| December 4
| Philadelphia
| 
| Peja Stojaković (20)
| Scot Pollard (13)
| Mike Bibby (6)
| ARCO Arena17,317
| 14–5
|-style="background:#cfc;"
| 10
| December 7
| L.A. Lakers
| 
| Peja Stojaković (25)
| Peja Stojaković (8)
| Doug Christie (7)
| ARCO Arena17,317
| 15–5
|-style="background:#cfc;"
| 21
| December 9
| Miami
| 
| Peja Stojaković (23)
| Doug Christie (9)
| Mike Bibby (7)
| ARCO Arena17,317
| 16–5
|-style="background:#cfc;"
| 22
| December 11
| Orlando
| 
| Chris Webber (24)
| Doug Christie (13)
| Mike Bibby (11)
| ARCO Arena17,317
| 17–5
|-style="background:#fcc;"
| 23
| December 12
| @ Phoenix
| 
| Chris Webber (21)
| Chris Webber (12)
| Mike Bibby (5)
| America West Arena14,568
| 17–6
|-style="background:#fcc;"
| 24
| December 14
| @ Minnesota
| 
| Chris Webber (26)
| Chris Webber (9)
| Mike Bibby (6)
| Target Center17,113
| 17–7
|-style="background:#cfc;"
| 25
| December 16
| Memphis
| 
| Chris Webber (22)
| Doug Christie (12)
| Doug Christie (7)
| ARCO Arena17,317
| 18–7
|-style="background:#cfc;"
| 26
| December 18
| Detroit
| 
| Mike Bibby (25)
| Chris Webber (14)
| Mike Bibby (7)
| ARCO Arena17,317
| 19–7
|-style="background:#fcc;"
| 27
| December 19
| @ Seattle
| 
| Doug Christie (23)
| Vlade Divac (8)
| Christie, Divac (5)
| KeyArena15,831
| 19–8
|-style="background:#fcc;"
| 28
| December 22
| @ L.A. Clippers
| 
| Christie, Jackson (19)
| Vlade Divac (12)
| Vlade Divac (8)
| Staples Center18,964
| 19–9
|-style="background:#cfc;"
| 29
| December 23
| Phoenix
| 
| Peja Stojaković (26)
| Hedo Türkoğlu (10)
| Vlade Divac (7)
| ARCO Arena17,317
| 20–9
|-style="background:#cfc;"
| 30
| December 26
| Portland
| 
| Peja Stojaković (19)
| Chris Webber (13)
| Vlade Divac (7)
| ARCO Arena17,317
| 21–9
|-style="background:#cfc;"
| 31
| December 28
| Minnesota
| 
| Peja Stojaković (27)
| Webber, Divac (8)
| Mike Bibby (7)
| ARCO Arena17,317
| 22–9
|-style="background:#cfc;"
| 32
| December 30
| Boston
| 
| Chris Webber (30)
| Scot Pollard (11)
| Doug Christie (7)
| ARCO Arena17,317
| 23–9

|-style="background:#cfc;"
| 33
| January 2
| L.A. Clippers
| 
| Chris Webber (21)
| Chris Weber (10)
| Mike Bibby (9)
| ARCO Arena17,317
| 24–9
|-style="background:#cfc;"
| 34
| January 5
| @ Phoenix
| 
| Chris Webber (35)
| Scot Pollard (13)
| Webber, Bibby (7)
| America West Arena17,042
| 25–9
|-style="background:#cfc;"
| 35
| January 6
| Milwaukee
| 
| Peja Stojaković (29)
| Vlade Divac (13)
| Chris Webber (9)
| ARCO Arena17,317
| 26–9
|-style="background:#cfc;"
| 36
| January 13
| Phoenix
| 
| Chris Webber (28)
| Chris Webber (13)
| Chris Webber (7)
| ARCO Arena17,317
| 27–9
|-style="background:#cfc;"
| 37
| January 15
| Cleveland
| 
| Peja Stojaković (36)
| Chris Webber (14)
| Chris Webber (8)
| ARCO Arena17,317
| 28–9
|-style="background:#cfc;"
| 38
| January 16
| @ Denver
| 
| Peja Stojaković (29)
| Chris Webber (12)
| Chris Webber (9)
| Pepsi Center16,780
| 29–9
|-style="background:#cfc;"
| 39
| January 18
| Golden State
| 
| Peja Stojaković (20)
| Webber, Türkoğlu (8)
| Vlade Divac (8)
| ARCO Arena17,317
| 30–9
|-style="background:#cfc;"
| 40
| January 21
| Memphis
| 
| Chris Webber (24)
| Webber, Pollard (11)
| Doug Christie (7)
| ARCO Arena17,317
| 31–9
|-style="background:#fcc;"
| 41
| January 22
| @ Portland
| 
| Chris Webber (34)
| Vlade Divac (9)
| Webber, Christie (8)
| Rose Garden19,980
| 31–10
|-style="background:#cfc;"
| 42
| January 24
| Utah
| 
| Chris Webber (24)
| Divac, Pollard (8)
| Doug Christie (5)
| ARCO Arena17,317
| 32–10
|-style="background:#cfc;"
| 43
| January 26
| @ Utah
| 
| Peja Stojaković (25)
| Chris Webber (10)
| Chris Webber (6)
| Delta Center19,571
| 33–10
|-style="background:#cfc;"
| 44
| January 31
| @ Seattle
| 
| Peja Stojaković (32)
| Vlade Divac (10)
| Mike Bibby (8)
| KeyArena17,072
| 34–10

|-style="background:#cfc;"
| 45
| February 1
| Denver
| 
| Chris Webber (29)
| Chris Webber (12)
| Christie, Bibby (6)
| ARCO Arena17,317
| 35–10
|-style="background:#cfc;"
| 46
| February 3
| @ Minnesota
| 
| Chris Webber (31)
| Chris Webber (14)
| Doug Christie (8)
| Target Center19,006
| 36–10
|-style="background:#fcc;"
| 47
| February 4
| @ New Jersey
| 
| Chris Webber (23)
| Chris Webber (9)
| Vlade Divac (5)
| Continental Airlines Arena14,840
| 36–11
|-style="background:#cfc;"
| 48
| February 6
| @ Boston
| 
| Peja Stojaković (24)
| Vlade Divac (14)
| Vlade Divac (10)
| FleetCenter15,621
| 37–11
|-style="background:#fcc;"
| 49
| February 7
| @ Washington
| 
| Chris Webber (21)
| Vlade Divac (10)
| Stojaković, Divac, Christie, Jackson (3)
| MCI Center20,674
| 37–12
|-style="background:#cfc;"
| 50
| February 12
| San Antonio
| 
| Peja Stojaković (23)
| Chris Webber (12)
| Mike Bibby (10)
| ARCO Arena17,317
| 38–12
|-style="background:#cfc;"
| 51
| February 14
| Washington
| 
| Peja Stojaković (21)
| Chris Webber (14)
| Chris Webber (9)
| ARCO Arena17,317
| 39–12
|-style="background:#fcc;"
| 52
| February 17
| Seattle
| 
| Chris Webber (39)
| Chris Webber (11)
| Mike Bibby (10)
| ARCO Arena17,317
| 39–13
|-style="background:#cfc;"
| 53
| February 19
| Atlanta
| 
| Chris Webber (19)
| Chris Webber (12)
| Mike Bibby (6)
| ARCO Arena17,317
| 40–13
|-style="background:#fcc;"
| 54
| February 21
| @ San Antonio
| 
| Bobby Jackson (18)
| Vlade Divac (9)
| Doug Christie (6)
| Alamodome18,594
| 40–14
|-style="background:#fcc;"
| 55
| February 23
| @ Dallas
| 
| Chris Webber (28)
| Chris Webber (14)
| Mike Bibby (7)
| American Airlines Center20,181
| 40–15
|-style="background:#cfc;"
| 56
| February 26
| Utah
| 
| Peja Stojaković (19)
| Vlade Divac (12)
| Mike Bibby (6)
| ARCO Arena17,317
| 41–15

|-style="background:#cfc;"
| 57
| March 1
| @ Golden State
| 
| Chris Webber (32)
| Vlade Divac (10)
| Chris Webber (8)
| The Arena in Oakland19,869
| 42–15
|-style="background:#fcc;"
| 58
| March 3
| Indiana
| 
| Mike Bibby (19)
| Vlade Divac (14)
| Stojaković, Webber, Divac (4)
| ARCO Arena17,317
| 42–16
|-style="background:#fcc;"
| 59
| March 4
| @ Portland
| 
| Peja Stojaković (26)
| Chris Webber (8)
| Hedo Türkoğlu (5)
| Rose Garden19,980
| 42–17
|-style="background:#cfc;"
| 60
| March 8
| Charlotte
| 
| Peja Stojaković (24)
| Vlade Divac (10)
| Vlade Divac (7)
| ARCO Arena17,317
| 43–17
|-style="background:#cfc;"
| 61
| March 10
| @ Milwaukee
| 
| Peja Stojaković (21)
| Chris Webber (15)
| Mike Bibby (9)
| Bradley Center18,178
| 44–17
|-style="background:#cfc;"
| 62
| March 11
| @ Chicago
| 
| Peja Stojaković (29)
| Vlade Divac (14)
| Chris Webber (6)
| United Center19,208
| 45–17
|-style="background:#cfc;"
| 63
| March 13
| @ Philadelphia
| 
| Chris Webber (22)
| Chris Webber (10)
| Bibby, Divac (7)
| First Union Center20,804
| 46–17
|-style="background:#fcc;"
| 64
| March 14
| @ New York
| 
| Mike Bibby (21)
| Scot Pollard (16)
| Vlade Divac (7)
| Madison Square Garden19,763
| 46–18
|-style="background:#cfc;"
| 65
| March 17
| @ Toronto
| 
| Chris Webber (31)
| Chris Webber (15)
| Christie, Webber (6)
| Air Canada Centre19,800
| 47–18
|-style="background:#cfc;"
| 66
| March 19
| Houston
| 
| Chris Webber (35)
| Chris Webber (12)
| Doug Christie (10)
| ARCO Arena17,317
| 48–18
|-style="background:#cfc;"
| 67
| March 21
| Denver
| 
| Hedo Türkoğlu (31)
| Vlade Divac (10)
| Hedo Türkoğlu (10)
| ARCO Arena17,317
| 49–18
|-style="background:#fcc;"
| 68
| March 24
| L.A. Lakers
| 
| Chris Webber (24)
| Vlade Divac (17)
| Webber, Bibby (5)
| ARCO Arena17,317
| 49–19
|-style="background:#cfc;"
| 69
| March 26
| L.A. Clippers
| 
| Chris Webber (35)
| Chris Weber (13)
| Doug Christie (6)
| ARCO Arena17,317
| 50–19
|-style="background:#cfc;"
| 70
| March 28
| @ Houston
| 
| Chris Webber (19)
| Divac, Webber (9)
| Chris Webber (6)
| Compaq Center12,515
| 51–19
|-style="background:#cfc;"
| 71
| March 29
| @ Charlotte
| 
| Chris Webber (23)
| Chris Webber (12)
| Chris Webber (6)
| Charlotte Coliseum14,092
| 52–19
|-style="background:#cfc;"
| 72
| March 31
| @ Atlanta
| 
| Chris Webber (29)
| Chris Webber (12)
| Chris Webber (7)
| Philips Arena19,841
| 53–19

|-style="background:#cfc;"
| 73
| April 2
| @ Memphis
| 
| Bobby Jackson (19)
| Chris Webber (11)
| Christie, Bibby (6)
| Pyramid Arena11,835
| 54–19
|-style="background:#cfc;"
| 74
| April 3
| @ Detroit
| 
| Chris Webber (28)
| Vlade Divac (9)
| Chris Webber (8)
| The Palace of Auburn Hills22,076
| 55–19
|-style="background:#cfc;"
| 75
| April 5
| @ Utah
| 
| Chris Webber (28)
| Chris Webber (10)
| Mike Bibby (7)
| Delta Center19,911
| 56–19
|-style="background:#cfc;"
| 76
| April 7
| New York
| 
| Chris Webber (16)
| Chris Webber (14)
| Doug Christie (8)
| ARCO Arena17,317
| 57–19
|-style="background:#cfc;"
| 77
| April 9
| Minnesota
| 
| Chris Webber (30)
| Scot Pollard (8)
| Doug Christie (8)
| ARCO Arena17,317
| 58–19
|-style="background:#cfc;"
| 78
| April 10
| @ Golden State
| 
| Chris Webber (31)
| Chris Webber (12)
| Vlade Divac (7)
| The Arena in Oakland16,232
| 59–19
|-style="background:#cfc;"
| 79
| April 12
| @ L.A. Clippers
| 
| Chris Webber (28)
| Vlade Divac (10)
| Mike Bibby (9)
| Staples Center19,818
| 60–19
|-style="background:#fcc;"
| 80
| April 14
| Dallas
| 
| Chris Webber (19)
| Webber, Divac (9)
| Doug Christie (8)
| ARCO Arena17,317
| 60–20
|-style="background:#cfc;"
| 81
| April 16
| Golden State
| 
| Lawrence Funderburke (29)
| Scot Pollard (14)
| Divac, Christie (7)
| ARCO Arena17,317
| 61–20
|-style="background:#fcc;"
| 82
| April 17
| @ L.A. Lakers
| 
| Funderburke, Bibby (15)
| Scot Pollard (11)
| Mike Bibby (4)
| Staples Center18,997
| 61–21

Playoffs

|- align="center" bgcolor="#ccffcc"
| 1
| April 20
| Utah
| W 89–86
| Chris Webber (24)
| Chris Webber (12)
| Chris Webber (7)
| ARCO Arena17,317
| 1–0
|- align="center" bgcolor="#ffcccc"
| 2
| April 23
| Utah
| L 86–93
| Vlade Divac (21)
| Chris Webber (9)
| Doug Christie (5)
| ARCO Arena17,317
| 1–1
|- align="center" bgcolor="#ccffcc"
| 3
| April 27
| @ Utah
| W 90–87
| Mike Bibby (26)
| Chris Webber (13)
| Mike Bibby (5)
| Delta Center19,911
| 2–1
|- align="center" bgcolor="#ccffcc"
| 4
| April 29
| @ Utah
| W 91–86
| Peja Stojaković (30)
| Chris Webber (9)
| Doug Christie (9)
| Delta Center19,911
| 3–1
|-

|- align="center" bgcolor="#ccffcc"
| 1
| May 4
| Dallas
| W 108–91
| Peja Stojaković (26)
| Vlade Divac (16)
| Bibby, Christie (8)
| ARCO Arena17,317
| 1–0
|- align="center" bgcolor="#ffcccc"
| 2
| May 6
| Dallas
| L 102–110
| Bibby, Webber (22)
| Stojaković, Webber (12)
| Mike Bibby (7)
| ARCO Arena17,317
| 1–1
|- align="center" bgcolor="#ccffcc"
| 3
| May 9
| @ Dallas
| W 125–119
| Chris Webber (31)
| Chris Webber (15)
| Mike Bibby (9)
| American Airlines Center20,265
| 2–1
|- align="center" bgcolor="#ccffcc"
| 4
| May 11
| @ Dallas
| W 115–113 (OT)
| Chris Webber (30)
| Vlade Divac (14)
| Bobby Jackson (5)
| American Airlines Center20,274
| 3–1
|- align="center" bgcolor="#ccffcc"
| 5
| May 13
| Dallas
| W 114–101
| Bibby, Webber (23)
| Hedo Türkoğlu (13)
| Doug Christie (7)
| ARCO Arena17,317
| 4–1
|-

|- align="center" bgcolor="#ffcccc"
| 1
| May 18
| L.A. Lakers
| L 99–106
| Chris Webber (28)
| Chris Webber (14)
| Chris Webber (6)
| ARCO Arena17,317
| 0–1
|- align="center" bgcolor="#ccffcc"
| 2
| May 20
| L.A. Lakers
| W 96–90
| Chris Webber (21)
| Vlade Divac (14)
| Mike Bibby (8)
| ARCO Arena17,317
| 1–1
|- align="center" bgcolor="#ccffcc"
| 3
| May 24
| @ L.A. Lakers
| W 103–90
| Chris Webber (26)
| Chris Webber (12)
| Christie, Webber (6)
| Staples Center18,997
| 2–1
|- align="center" bgcolor="#ffcccc"
| 4
| May 26
| @ L.A. Lakers
| L 99–100
| Vlade Divac (23)
| Hedo Türkoğlu (12)
| Christie, Webber (5)
| Staples Center18,997
| 2–2
|- align="center" bgcolor="#ccffcc"
| 5
| May 28
| L.A. Lakers
| W 92–91
| Chris Webber (29)
| Chris Webber (13)
| three players tied (3)
| ARCO Arena17,317
| 3–2
|- align="center" bgcolor="#ffcccc"
| 6
| May 31
| @ L.A. Lakers
| L 102–106
| Chris Webber (26)
| Chris Webber (13)
| Chris Webber (8)
| Staples Center18,997
| 3–3
|- align="center" bgcolor="#ffcccc"
| 7
| June 2
| L.A. Lakers
| L 106–112 (OT)
| Mike Bibby (29)
| Vlade Divac (10)
| Chris Webber (11)
| ARCO Arena17,317
| 3–4
|-

Player statistics

Season

‡Waived during the season

Playoffs

Awards and records
 Chris Webber, All-NBA Second Team
 Doug Christie, NBA All-Defensive Second Team

Transactions

References

 Sacramento Kings on Database Basketball
 Sacramento Kings on Basketball Reference

Sacramento Kings seasons
Sac
Sacramento
Sacramento